Southern Pacific Railroad's AC-7 class of cab forward steam locomotives was the fourth class of the 4-8-8-2 locomotives purchased by Southern Pacific (SP).  The locomotives were built by Baldwin Locomotive Works and shared many of the same characteristics of previous AC class locomotives.

The AC-7s were only slightly larger than their AC-6 predecessors, but they included larger tenders and a beveled cab front in contrast to the earlier classes' flat cab front.  In the early 1940s, the majority of the class received larger cab windows of a design that would become standard with the AC-8 class.

In April 1937, locomotive number 4162 was pulled aside for a series of publicity photos at SP's Sacramento, California, shops.  It was posed alongside the railroad's first locomotive, C. P. Huntington a diminutive 4-2-4T, especially when compared to 4162.

The AC-7 class locomotives were all removed from active service between 1954 and 1958, and they were all scrapped shortly after their removal from service.  The first to be scrapped was 4155 on November 26, 1954, while the last was 4172 on April 24, 1959.

References 
 

AC-07
4-8-8-2 locomotives
Baldwin locomotives
Simple articulated locomotives
Railway locomotives introduced in 1937
Steam locomotives of the United States
Scrapped locomotives
Standard gauge locomotives of the United States
Cab forward steam locomotives 
Freight locomotives